WISE-FM is a Public Radio formatted broadcast radio station licensed to Wise, Virginia, serving Norton, Coeburn and Clintwood in Virginia. WISE-FM is owned and operated by Virginia Polytechnic Institute and State University. The station broadcasts in HD Radio; HD1 rebroadcasts the news/talk programming of Radio IQ and local programming of WEHC, while HD2 is a feed of WVTF Music.

WISE-FM is one of three stations whose call signs spell out their city of license; the others are WACO-FM and WARE.

Programming
WISE-FM is a mix of national, international, and local programming. During the overnight and morning hours, WISE-FM airs the news and public affairs programs of parent station WVTF, including BBC World Service news, Morning Edition, All Things Considered, and 1A. As of November 12, 2022, WISE also airs the entire roster of local music and public affairs programs that originate from Emory, Virginia station WEHC.

Translators
In addition to the main station, WISE-FM is relayed by FM translators to widen its broadcast area. The translators are split between the HD1 and HD2 services.

See also
 WVTF — Radio IQ flagship
 WWVT-FM — WVTF Music flagship

References

External links
 WVTF Public Radio Online
 

1999 establishments in Virginia
Public radio stations in the United States
NPR member stations
Radio stations established in 1999
ISE-FM
ISE-FM